Joseph David Murray (born May 3, 1961) is an American animator, writer, illustrator, producer, director, and voice actor, best known as the creator of Nickelodeon's Rocko's Modern Life and Cartoon Network's Camp Lazlo, and is now the creator of PBS Kids' Let's Go Luna!. Born in San Jose, California, USA, Murray was interested in a career in the arts when he was three. He credits his high school art teacher Mark Briggs with teaching him a lot about art. Murray was a political cartoonist for a newspaper, often targeting then-President Jimmy Carter. As a young adult Murray was hired as a designer at an agency, where he invested his earnings from the production company into independent animated films. In 1981 at age 20, he founded his independent illustration production company called Joe Murray Studios while he was still in college.

Later in 1992, Murray created his first animated short film in color called My Dog Zero, after which he decided to develop a television series titled Rocko's Modern Life for Nickelodeon. After pitching it to Nickelodeon, the company decided to create the concept. While creating the series, Murray hired comedian and actor Carlos Alazraqui to supply the voice for the character of Rocko. The series premiered on Nickelodeon on September 18, 1993, and ended on November 24, 1996, completing four seasons and 52 episodes. After Rocko's Modern Life, in 2004, Murray wanted to create another television series, this time for Cartoon Network. He created his second series Camp Lazlo as a pilot, where he served as the producer of that pilot. After Cartoon Network decided to create the show, Murray brought fellow Rocko cast members Carlos Alazraqui, Tom Kenny (who, post-Rocko, became known as the voice of SpongeBob SquarePants) and Mr. Lawrence to voice the main characters Lazlo (Alazraqui), Scoutmaster Lumpus (Kenny) and Edward (Lawrence). The series first aired in 2005, and ended production in 2008, with five seasons and 65 episodes.

Murray is the winner of two Primetime Emmy Awards for Camp Lazlo (Outstanding Special Class – Short-Format Animated Programs) and Outstanding Animated Program (for Programming One Hour or More) for the TV film Camp Lazlo: Where's Lazlo?. Murray set up the website KaboingTV, dedicated to streaming original animation, for which Murray contributed a short series entitled Frog in a Suit. 
In 2017 he created Let's Go Luna!, which premiered on November 21, 2018 on PBS Kids, and as of 2021, has aired two seasons.
 
Murray is also a writer and illustrator, and is the author of the book Creating Animated Cartoons with Character, which features animators about their careers in animated cartoons.

Murray took inspiration for his work from Max Fleischer, Chuck Jones, Tex Avery, Bob Clampett, Hanna-Barbera, UPA, Jay Ward, Walt Disney, Ub Iwerks and Paul Terry.

Career

Early career
Born and raised in San Jose, California, Joe Murray said that he developed an interest in working as an artist as a career when he was three years old. According to Murray, his kindergarten teacher told his mother that he was the only student who drew zippers on pants and breasts on women. Murray credits his Leland High School art teacher Mark Briggs for teaching him "so much about my art." At age 16, he became a full-time artist.

Taking the position of political cartoonist for a newspaper in San Jose, his cartoons often targeted then-President Jimmy Carter. On his website, in a 2007 entry he said that he admired Carter's post-presidential work.

As a young adult, he was hired as a designer at an agency. Murray invested his earnings from the company into independent animated films. At age 20, Murray founded his independent illustration company, Joe Murray Studios (or Joe Murray Productions), in 1981 while still in university. His early attempts at animation date back to 1986 when he joined De Anza College. Murray created several short animated films, his most successful was made in 1987, which was a two-minute animated short titled "The Chore," which focused on a harried husband who uses his cat as a novel solution while not wanting to do a chore for his wife. He drew the scenes on typing paper and shot the scenes with 16 mm film. For creating "The Chore" Murray earned the Merit Student Academy Award two years later in 1989.

In 1988, he did 2 network IDs for MTV, and left in 1991 in hopes of starting his own projects. One of the MTV ID's Murray created involved the future Rocko's Modern Life character Heffer Wolfe; the ID featured Heffer being pushed out of a building with the MTV logo branded onto his buttocks.

My Dog Zero
My Dog Zero, released in 1992, was Murray's third independent film and first color film. Murray said that My Dog Zero was his "most gratifying" artistic project to date because of his own "stubbornness" in resolving the obstacles and issues involved in the production, such as lack of funding and lack of resources. With a grant he employed twelve people, mostly university students, to cel-paint the film. According to Murray, when he finished the film, several distributors refused to air it. He appeared at the Palace of Fine Arts in San Francisco with a copy of the film and persuaded the staff to air the film with the scheduled films. According to Murray, My Dog Zero received "good response".

To fund the film, Murray initially tried to pre-sell the television show rights to My Dog Zero but instead created a separate television series called Rocko's Modern Life.

Rocko's Modern Life

Murray created and was the executive producer for the animated series Rocko's Modern Life, which aired on Nickelodeon from 1993 to 1996. He voiced the character Ralph Bighead in the episodes "I Have No Son" and "Wacky Delly", and a caricature version of himself in "Short Story".

Originally, the character Rocko appeared in an unpublished comic book titled Travis. Murray tried selling the comic book in the late 1980s, but was never successful of getting it in production. Murray wanted funding for My Dog Zero, so he wanted Nickelodeon to pre-buy television rights for the series. Murray presented a pencil test to Nickelodeon Studios, which afterwards became interested in buying and airing the show. After deciding that My Dog Zero would not work as a television series, Murray combed through his sketchbooks, developed the Rocko's Modern Life concept and submitted it to Nickelodeon, believing that the concept would likely be rejected. According to Murray, around three or four months later he had "forgotten about" the concept and was working on My Dog Zero when Linda Simensky informed Murray that Nickelodeon wanted a pilot episode. Murray said that he was glad that he would get funding for My Dog Zero.

In 1992, two months prior to the production of season 1 of Rocko's Modern Life, Murray's first wife, Diane, committed suicide. Murray had blamed the show being taken as the reason for his wife's suicide. Murray felt that he had emotional and physical "unresolved issues" when he moved to Los Angeles. He describes the experience as like participating in "marathon with my pants around my ankles". Murray initially believed that he would create one season, move back to the San Francisco Bay Area and "clean up the loose ends I had left hanging". To his surprise Nickelodeon approved new seasons.

After season 3 he decided to hand the project to the late Stephen Hillenburg, who did most work for season 4 and created SpongeBob SquarePants shortly after that; Murray continued to manage the cartoon. Murray said that he would completely leave the production after season 4. Murray said that he encouraged the network to continue production. Nickelodeon decided to cancel the series. Murray described all 52 episodes as "top notch" and that, in his view, the quality of a television show may decline as production continues "when you are dealing with volume".

Post-Rocko's Modern Life
After completing 52 episodes of Rocko's Modern Life, Murray took a break from the animation business and produced two children's books and illustrated two others: Who Asked the Moon to Dinner? (1999), The Enormous Mister Schmupsle: An ABC Adventure (2003), Hugville (written by Court Crandall) (2005), and Funny Cryptograms (written by Shawn Kennedy).

Murray was working on a web-based cartoon named The Family Pop, which was produced in Flash and was in the middle of negotiations for this cartoon just prior to the onset of Camp Lazlo. On September 30, 2008, Murray added a new feature to his website, The Tin Box, where Murray posts some of his independent work. The first work posted was "Where's Poppa", a short episode of The Family Pop.

Camp Lazlo

Murray decided to return to television cartooning, this time selling his work to Cartoon Network Studios. In 2005, he produced a pilot for the cartoon Camp Lazlo, which was picked up for a 13-episode first season and ran for five seasons, with production ending in November 2007.

On September 8, 2007, the TV movie Where's Lazlo? won an Emmy for Outstanding Animated Program (For an Hour or More). During the production of Camp Lazlo, Murray underwent a divorce.

Post-Camp Lazlo
Once production finished for Camp Lazlo, and the final episodes were delivered, Murray developed a new television series. While he is working out details about production and distribution, he has started work on his next independent film project, Fish Head, and publishing Creating Animated Cartoons with Character, a book on creating and producing an animated TV series, and working on producing a new short series, entitled Frog in a Suit for his web network; KaboingTV.

Murray also worked on the hour-long Rocko TV special Rocko's Modern Life: Static Cling, which premiered on Netflix August 9, 2019.

KaboingTV
Murray is currently planning to develop KaboingTV, a web network entirely dedicated to cartoons. On April 20, 2010, Murray launched a donation drive on Kickstarter to fund the project, he required $16,800 by June 5 to reach the total funding amount for his project; otherwise, it would be cancelled. The project surpassed the amount of funding needed, and Murray is currently developing the next Frog in a Suit episodes. KaboingTV premiered in March 11, 2011.

Let's Go Luna!
Murray worked on the PBS animated series Let's Go Luna!, which aired from November 2018 to November 2022.

Character creation process

On his personal website, Murray describes his character creation process as "sometimes like playing Frankenstein".
 He starts with the personality. He shapes the conditions that make the character "tick", the character's imperfections, and the appeal. He asks himself, "Why would I want to tell stories about them?".
 If he is working with an anthropomorphic series or book with varying animals, he chooses an animal that, in his eyes, match the created personality. According to Murray, this resulted in a social caricature in Rocko's Modern Life.
 If he is working with an anthropomorphic series or book using one animal, he alters the specific character design to match the personality.
 Murray likes to vary eyeballs by size and color. He also varies nostrils. Murray believes that inconsistencies "make it more interesting".
 Murray then selects colors that, in his view, "feels right". He believes that yellow and bright colors "match a mood". If a character is "negative", he will pick a color that, in his opinion, matches the character.
 If he has to teach a crew of artists how to draw the character, he creates a model sheet for the character.

Murray explains that one of the interesting aspects of character creation is the evolution of the personalities over time. In a one-time movie, the characters will have a static personality, but for a television series, the characters will change from season to season, developing new relationships, and even changing from mere background characters into a main character.

Filmography

Television

Film/Special

Internet

Books

Written and illustrated
 Who Asked the Moon to Dinner? (December 31, 1999) (Published in English and Korean)
 The Enormous Mr. Schmupsle! (August 2003)
 Crafting a Cartoon (September 12, 2008)
 Creating Animated Cartoons with Character (August 24, 2010)

Illustrated
 Funny Cryptograms (May 28, 2003)
 Hugville (December 27, 2005)

Independent films
 "The Chore" (1987)
 '"My Dog Zero" (1992) (Murray's third independent film)
 "The Affair" (2002)
 "Fishing"
 "Fish Head" (in production)

References

External links

 
 Joe Murray's Blog
 
 
 Lambiek Comiclopedia biography.

American animated film directors
American animated film producers
Living people
20th-century American artists
21st-century American writers
21st-century American artists
Artists from Los Angeles
Animators from California
American bloggers
American cartoonists
American filmmakers
American male voice actors
American storyboard artists
American television directors
American television writers
Artists from San Jose, California
Nickelodeon Animation Studio people
Cartoon Network Studios people
Leland High School (San Jose, California) alumni
American male television writers
Primetime Emmy Award winners
Showrunners
Television producers from California
Writers from Los Angeles
Writers from San Jose, California
Writers from the San Francisco Bay Area
Screenwriters from California
1961 births
American male bloggers